The  branch, also called the , of Jōdo-shū Buddhism is the main branch that exists today, and was first established by Benchō a disciple of Hōnen, but formalized into a separate branch by Benchō's disciple Ryōchū. 

Originally based in Kyushu where Benchō had been exiled, the sect contended with other disciples of Hōnen until it emerged into the dominant branch today. Its origins in Kyushu are also the reason for the sect's name, as Chinzei was an older name for Kyushu and was adopted by Benchō.

The famous temple of Chion-in, Hōnen's gravesite, and the temple of Zōjō-ji in Tokyo are all administered by the Chinzei branch.

References 

Jōdo-shū